1-2-3-Nul! is an EP by British band The Futureheads, released in 2003. The album was released on Fantastic Plastic Records, before the band signed to a major label. Due to the band having gained an amount of mainstream popularity and the EP's 'limited edition' status (only 1000 copies were made) the release is now very popular among record collectors and can fetch high prices.

Track listing

References 

The Futureheads EPs
Fantastic Plastic Records EPs
2003 EPs